Roland Teymurazovich Gigolayev (born 4 January 1990) is a Russian football left midfielder or defender of Ossetian origin. He plays for FC Tekstilshchik Ivanovo.

Club career
He made his professional debut for FC Alania Vladikavkaz on 4 April 2011, in a Russian First Division game against FC Torpedo Vladimir and scored 2 goals on his debut.

In the 2014–2015 season he played with Ruch Chorzów in elimination from UEFA Europa League. His team was out this elimination after matches with Metalist Kharkiv (0:0 in Gliwice and 0:1 in Kiev).

On 17 February 2016, he returned to Russia, signing with FC Amkar Perm.

On 31 August 2017, he signed a three-year contract with FC Akhmat Grozny. After appearing only once for Akhmat in the 2017–18 season, on 23 July 2018 he joined FC Anzhi Makhachkala on a season-long loan.

Club

References

1990 births
Footballers from Tbilisi
Living people
Ossetian people
Ossetian footballers
Russian footballers
Association football midfielders
Russia youth international footballers
Russia under-21 international footballers
Russian Premier League players
Ekstraklasa players
FC Zenit Saint Petersburg players
FC Spartak Vladikavkaz players
FC Petrotrest players
FC Dynamo Saint Petersburg players
Ruch Chorzów players
FC Amkar Perm players
FC Akhmat Grozny players
FC Anzhi Makhachkala players
FC Urozhay Krasnodar players
FC Tekstilshchik Ivanovo players
Russian expatriate footballers
Expatriate footballers in Poland
Russian expatriate sportspeople in Poland